George F. Wingard (born November 6, 1935) is an American businessman who served a member of the Oregon House of Representatives and Oregon State Senate.

He was born in Amboy, Washington, and attended the University of Oregon. He was a builder and businessman. Wingard served one term in the Oregon House of Representatives from 1969 to 1971 prior to his election to the senate. He ran for State Treasurer of Oregon in 1980 and 1992. He also served on the city council of Eugene, Oregon. Currently a Democrat, At 87 an avid antique race car restorer and race car driver at Laguna Seca and at the Goodwood Festival of Speed

References

1935 births
Living people
Republican Party members of the Oregon House of Representatives
Republican Party Oregon state senators
Politicians from Eugene, Oregon
People from Clark County, Washington
University of Oregon alumni
Oregon city council members
Candidates in the 1980 United States elections
Candidates in the 1992 United States elections
20th-century American politicians
Businesspeople from Eugene, Oregon